is a Japanese animation studio, located in Suginami, Tokyo, best known for its work on the Rebuild of Evangelion film tetralogy.  is the primary animation production studio. It was founded by Hideaki Anno in May 2006, and was shown publicly on 1 August when recruitment notices were posted on his website; Anno remains its president.  The name khara comes from the Greek word χαρά, meaning joy. In 2016, Khara sued Gainax for 100 million yen in unpaid royalties from an agreement that Khara would earn royalties from income received on works and properties that founder Hideaki Anno had worked on. The suit alleged that Gainax delayed on paying royalties and incurred a large debt with Khara, which had loaned 100 million yen in August 2014, but had yet to receive payment on the loan.

History
Anno left Gainax and transitioned to Khara; as part of his public statements on the Rebuild films, he wrote:
"For this purpose, we are not returning to our roots at Gainax. I have set up a production company and studio, and it is in this new setting that we will start again. Without looking back, without admiration for the circumstances, we aim to walk towards the future. Thankfully, we have gathered staff from the old series, new staff, and many other fantastic staff to work on this series. We realize that we are creating something that will be better than the last series."

Key contributors brought back to work on the new project include assistant director Kazuya Tsurumaki, character designer Yoshiyuki Sadamoto, storyboard artist Shinji Higuchi, composer Shirō Sagisu, and animator Mahiro Maeda.

Works

Television
The Dragon Dentist (2017)
Kaiju No. 8 (2024, kaiju designs)

OVA/ONAs
Japan Animator Expo (2014–2015)
Gravity Rush: The Animation ~ Overture ~ (2016)
 VOY@GER (2021) (co-produced with CloverWorks)

Animated films
Evangelion: 1.0 You Are (Not) Alone (2007)
Evangelion: 2.0 You Can (Not) Advance (2009)
Evangelion: 3.0 You Can (Not) Redo (2012)
Mary and the Witch's Flower (2017) (co-produced with Studio Ponoc)
Evangelion: 3.0+1.0 Thrice Upon a Time (2021)

Live-action films
Kantoku Shikkaku (2011)
Giant God Warrior Appears in Tokyo (2012, co-produced with Studio Ghibli)
Shin Godzilla (2016, co-produced with Toho Pictures) [uncredited]
Shin Ultraman (2022, co-produced with Tsuburaya Productions and Toho Pictures)
Shin Kamen Rider (2023, co-produced with Toei Company) [uncredited]

Video games
Fire Emblem Echoes: Shadows of Valentia (2017)
Ace Combat 7: Skies Unknown (2019)

References

External links

   
 

Khara
Japanese animation studios
Japanese companies established in 2006
Mass media companies established in 2006
Animation studios in Tokyo
Hideaki Anno